The Wiley P. McNair House is a historic house located in Fayetteville, Arkansas.

Description and history 
It is a -story timber-framed structure, with a side gable roof and two projecting front gables. The left gable is atop a two-story projecting section, and there is a single-story shed-roof porch extending to the right. It was built about 1888 for a railroad agent, on land that was originally part of the Fayetteville Female Seminary campus.

The house was listed on the National Register of Historic Places on September 20, 2016.

See also
National Register of Historic Places listings in Washington County, Arkansas

References

Houses on the National Register of Historic Places in Arkansas
Houses completed in 1888
Houses in Fayetteville, Arkansas
National Register of Historic Places in Fayetteville, Arkansas
Queen Anne architecture in Arkansas